Torstar Corporation is a Canadian mass media company which primarily publishes news. In addition to the Toronto Star, its flagship and namesake, Torstar also publishes daily newspapers in Hamilton, Peterborough, Niagara Region, and Waterloo Region In addition to the Metroland Media Group and a minority position on Canadian Press. The corporation was initially established in 1958 to take over operations of the Star from the Atkinson Foundation after a provincial law banned charitable organizations from owning for-profit entities. From 1958 to 2020, the class A shares of Torstar were held by the families of the original Atkinson Foundation trustees. The private investment firm NordStar Capital LP, now owned by Jordan Bitove acquired The company in 2020.

History 
Torstar was founded after the Ontario government passed a law barring the provisions of late-Toronto Star owner Joseph Atkinson's will from being enacted. Atkinson had bequeathed the newspaper to a charitable organization he had founded. The Progressive Conservative provincial government of George Drew passed a law banning charitable organizations from operating profitable entities such as newspapers. Rather than sell the newspaper, the trustees of the Atkinson Foundation bought out the Star privately and founded Torstar as a private corporation.

On November 26, 2010, it was announced that the Canadian Press news agency would be taken over by a for-profit corporation, with Torstar serving as one of its investors. 
On November 27, 2017, Postmedia and Torstar announced a transaction in which Postmedia will sell seven dailies, eight community papers, and the Toronto and Vancouver 24 Hours to Torstar, in exchange for 22 community papers and the Ottawa and Winnipeg versions of Metro. Except for the Exeter Times-Advocate, St. Catharines Standard, Niagara Falls Review, Peterborough Examiner, and Welland Tribune, all acquired papers will be closed. Torstar stated that it wanted to focus on building synergies within its existing markets served. The swaps effectively remove competition between the two companies in the affected markets; the Competition Bureau stated that it would review the proposed deal. and in March 2018, formally accused the companies of using no-compete clauses to reduce competition in the newspaper industry, in violation of the Competition Act.
On December 20, 2018, Torstar applied to the Ontario Superior Court for an order to keep documents seized from its offices by the Competition Bureau sealed from the public.

Sale to NordStar

Initial NordStar Proposal 
On May 26, 2020, Toronto Star publisher John Honderich announced the sale of Torstar to Nordstar Capital LP, for $52-million. The price for the class A voting shares and class B non-voting shares was set at 63 cents in the deal. At the time of the most recent quarter, Torstar had $69-million in cash on its balance sheet – more than the $52-million acquisition price from Nordstar. However, Torstar’s share price had suffered from the company’s inability to generate enough revenue or cost savings to pay quarterly dividends, which were suspended late in 2019. The suspension pushed the publicly traded B shares to what was then the lowest level since at least the late 1990s — 53 cents. Weeks prior to the announcement of the deal, Torstar had reported a $23.5-million loss for the first quarter of 2020.

The new owners planned to make Torstar a private company with former Premier of Ontario David Peterson as chair of the board.

NordStar Revised Proposal & Final Sale 
On July 11, the NordStar bid was increased to $60-million, or 74 cents per share, with the Voting Trust and Fairfax revising their soft lock-up agreements, to hard lock-ups. This effectively put an end to the bidding process because the terms of the revised bid meant that "the Voting Trust and Fairfax can’t change their votes to support any other bid".

In the shareholder vote held on July 21, 99.7% of the class A shareholders favoured the NordStar offer as did 98.1% class B shareholders. However, only 81.9% of minority shareholders (not including the Voting Trust or Fairfax Financial) voted to accept the NordStar offer. On July 23, Blake, Cassels & Graydon LLP, an international corporate law firm representing Torstar, brought forth a motion on behalf of Torstar before Ontario Superior Court Justice Gilmore to approve Torstar’s plan of arrangement with respect to the acquisition of Torstar. Grant Vingoe, chair of the Ontario Securities Commission, had previously said in a letter to Andrea Horvath that the court was the appropriate venue to challenge the proposal. He further said that the test to be applied by the court was whether the process leading to the arrangement was fair and reasonable.
On July 25, the Globe and Mail published an interview with Butch Folland, a significant member of Torstar’s voting trust and the great grandson of the founder of Torstar, Joseph E. Atkinson, Torstar’s original publisher and the author of the Atkinson Principles. Mr. Folland is also the grandson of Harry Hindmarsh, who was President of the Star following Mr. Atkinson’s death in 1948. His personal ties to the Toronto Star date back to age 13 when he took a job as an office boy. In that article. Mr. Folland is quoted as saying “I was really disappointed in the outcome. I felt that the process wasn’t really fair in the way it affected me.” 

Late in the evening on July 27, an Ontario court approved the $60-million takeover of Torstar Corp. by private equity firm NordStar Capital LP over the objections of a rival bidding group, which immediately said it planned to appeal the judge’s decision. Ontario Superior Court Justice Cory Gilmore ruled NordStar, could close their purchase of Torstar,

Operations

Daily News Brands
The Daily News Brands division primarily comprises the Toronto Star and its associated properties, including Torstar Syndication Services. The division also owns The Hamilton Spectator, the Waterloo Region Record, the St. Catharines Standard, the Niagara Falls Review, the Welland Tribune, and the Peterborough Examiner.  
The StarMetro chain of free daily newspapers serving Calgary, Edmonton, Halifax, Toronto, and Vancouver was also part of this division until publication of those titles ceased in 2019.

Community Brands
The Community Brands division, Metroland Media Group, owns more than 70 weekly community papers as of late May 2020, the free magazine Canadian Immigrant, and other community-oriented properties.

VerticalScope 

On July 29, 2015, Torstar announced its acquisition of a 56% majority stake in VerticalScope, a Toronto-based operator of online communities, for $200 million. The company operates websites and message boards that focus on niche categories, particularly within the automotive industry. Torstar CEO David Holland explained that the purchase was designed to bolster the company's presence in digital media.

Star Touch and ePaper apps 
Launched in 2015, Toronto Star Touch was the company's app designed specifically for tablet computers. It was discontinued in late July 2017 after an investment totaling $20 million because of an inadequate volume of readers and advertisers and was replaced by universal apps available for both Android and iOS smartphones and tablets.

Management
The following is a list of past presidents and CEOs of Torstar:

 Beland Honderich 1966–1988 (as president), 1976–1988 (as CEO and chair)
 David R. Jolley 1988–1994
 David A. Galloway 1988–2002
 J. Robert S. Prichard 2002–2009
 David P. Holland 2009–2017
 Neil Oliver 2022–present

Other investments 
Torstar owns a 20 per cent stake in the Victoria, British Columbia-based newspaper publisher Black Press, The company is also part owner of The Canadian Press.

Past investments
Torstar launched a weekly celebrity-based magazine called Scoop in 2005, which folded one year later.

Between late 2005 and early 2011, Torstar also held a 20 per cent stake in CTVglobemedia, a Canadian media company which broke up when BCE Inc., the parent company of Bell Canada, purchased the company's media assets. This caused some controversy because CTVgm owned The Globe and Mail, a competing newspaper to Torstar's own Toronto Star. There were no editorial hurdles between the two newspapers however. Torstar sold its shares in 2011.

On May 2, 2014, Torstar announced the sale of Harlequin Enterprises, a publisher of romance novels, to HarperCollins for $415 million.

See also

 Postmedia Network
 Quebecor Media
 The Woodbridge Company
 Grant v. Torstar Corp.

References

External links
Torstar corporate webpage

 
Companies formerly listed on the Toronto Stock Exchange
Newspaper companies of Canada
Companies based in Toronto
 
1958 establishments in Ontario